Giuseppe Morello (born 12 October 1985) is a Swiss-Italian footballer who plays for FC Biel/Bienne in the Swiss Challenge League.

References

External links

1985 births
Living people
Swiss men's footballers
Italian footballers
Swiss Super League players
Swiss Challenge League players
FC Concordia Basel players
BSC Young Boys players
FC Thun players
FC Biel-Bienne players
Association football forwards